Noman Mubashir (born June 13, 1974) is a Norwegian journalist employed by the NRK.

Of Pakistani descent, early in his career he hosted the multi-ethnic programme Migrapolis on NRK and later worked as a news anchor on Østlandssendingen, also NRK. He has published two books. His first release was Mitt liv som Ola Noman, where he describes in a humoristic manner his experiences growing up as a child of Pakistani immigrants in Norway. His second publication was En Noman i Pakistan which is a traveller's guide to Pakistan and completes his NRK series of the same title.

Personal life 
Noman Mubashir is openly gay, coming out in 2016.

See also
 Norwegians of Pakistani descent

References 

1974 births
Living people
Norwegian television presenters
Norwegian television news anchors
Norwegian gay writers
Gay journalists
Norwegian people of Pakistani descent
Norwegian LGBT journalists